Syllepte rhyparialis is a moth in the family Crambidae. It was described by Oberthür in 1893. It is found in China.

References

Moths described in 1893
rhyparialis
Moths of Asia